Olivette Bice (née Daruhi born 12 May 1968 in Espiritu Santo) is a Vanuatuan sprinter.

Bice was the first ever female competitor at the Summer Olympics for her country when she went to the 1988 Summer Olympics held in Seoul. In the 100 metres she ran 13 seconds and finished 7th out of 8 in her heat so didn't qualify for the next round, she also ran in the 200 metres and finished 5th out of 7 in her heat and again she failed to qualify for the next round.

References

External links
 

1968 births
Living people
People from Sanma Province
Vanuatuan female sprinters
Olympic athletes of Vanuatu
Athletes (track and field) at the 1988 Summer Olympics